The women's doubles wheelchair tennis tournament at the 2016 Paralympic Games in Rio de Janeiro was held at the Olympic Tennis Centre in the Barra Olympic Park in Barra da Tijuca in the west zone of Rio de Janeiro, Brazil from 9 to 16 September 2016.

Draw

Preliminaries

The women's doubles consisted of ten pairings. In the first round, four of these pairings played off for the final two places in the quarterfinals. The other six pairings received byes to the last eight.

Final rounds

References 

 
 

Quad doubles